

Statistics Norway demographic statistics 

The following demographic statistics are from the Statistics Norway, unless otherwise indicated.

Age and sex distribution

Age structure

Norway 

(2005 est.) 
0–14 years: 19.7% (male 466,243; female 443,075) 
15–64 years: 65.6% (male 1,234,384; female 1,486,887) 
65 years and over: 14.7% (male 285,389; female 392,331)

Northern Norway 

(2009 est.) 
0–14 years: 18.9% (male 44,848; female 42,315) 
15–64 years: 65.5% (male 156,476; female 147,465) 
65 years and over: 15.6% (male 32,017; female 40,304)

Population

 464,328 (January 1, 2000)
 464,649 (July 1, 2009)
 Population growth
 321 (0.06%)

Population - comparative
slightly larger than Malta, but slightly smaller than Luxembourg.

Population growth rate

0.29% (in 2008)

Population growth rate - comparative
slightly larger than United Kingdom, but slightly smaller than Denmark.

Total fertility rate

1.98 children born/woman (2007)

Language

Literacy

definition: age 15 and over can read and write 
total population: 100% 
male: NA% 
female: NA%

Demographics of Norway